M'hamed Boucetta (in Arabic: امحمد بوستة – Born 23 December 1925 in Marrakech – Dead 17 February 2017 in Rabat) was a Moroccan politician and lawyer.

Boucetta held several top political position in post-independent Morocco, including: Minister of Justice (1961–1963), Minister of Foreign Affairs (1977–1979, 1979–1983) and co-founder and secretary general of the Istiqlal Party (1974–1998).

References

1925 births
2017 deaths
20th-century Moroccan people
Moroccan politicians
People from Marrakesh